A drawbar or spindle drawbar is a clamping mechanism for toolholders on machine tools. The toolholder or machine taper itself is held by the drawbar and applies force to the spindle, especially when spinning at low speeds.

See also 
 Drawbar Force Gauge
 Milling machine
 Machine tools

References

External links
Don’t Forget The Drawbar, Modern Machine Shop magazine, March 2006, By Peter Zelinski

Machine tools